The Seneschal of Gascony was an officer carrying out and managing the domestic affairs of the lord of the Duchy of Gascony.  During the course of the twelfth century, the seneschalship, also became an office of military command. After 1360, the officer was the Seneschal of Aquitaine. There was an office above the seneschalcy, the Lieutenancy of the Duchy of Aquitaine, but it was filled only intermittently (in times of emergency).

The seneschal managed the household, coordinating between the receivers of various landholdings and the chamber, treasury, and the chancellory or chapel.  The seneschals of Gascony, like those appointed in Normandy, Poitou, and Anjou had custody of demesne fortresses, the regional treasuries, and presidency of the highest court of regional custom. Detailed records of the Gascon Exchequers during the reign of Henry III of England indicate that there most likely was a functioning exchequer.

List of Seneschals
Robert of Thornham (1201–1202)
Geoffrey de Neville (1214) – first appointment
Reginald of Pons (1214–1217)
Geoffrey de Neville (1218–1219) – second appointment
Philip of Oldcoates (1220) – died while enroute in October 1220
Hugh de Vivonne (1221) – first appointment
Savari de Mauléon (1221–1224)
Richard of Cornwall (1225)
Henry de Turberville (1227–1230) – first appointment 
Richard de Burgh (1231) – never took office
Hugh de Vivonne (1231–1234) – second appointment
Henry de Turberville (1234–1237) – second appointment
Hubert Hoese (1237–1238)
Henry de Turberville (1238) – third appointment
Rustan de Solers (1241–1242)
John Maunsell (1242–1243)
Nicholas de Moels (1243–1245)
William de Boell (1245–1247)
Drogo de Barentyn (1247–1248)  – first appointment 
Simon de Montfort (1248)
Richard de Grey (1248)
Drogo de Barentyn (1250) – second appointment, held jointly
Peter de Bordeaux (1250) – held jointly
John de Grey (1253–1254)
Richard de Grey – acting during the seneschal's absence in 1253
Stephen Bauzan (1254–1255)
Stephen Longespée (1255)
Bertrand de Cardaillac (1259–1260)
Drogo de Barentyn (1260) – third appointment
Jean I de Grailly (1266–1268) – first appointment 
Thomas d'Ippegrave (1268–1269)
Fortaner de Cazeneuve (1269)
Hugh de Turberville (1271–1272)
Luke de Tany (1272–1278)
Jean I de Grailly (1278–1283) – second appointment
John de Vaux (1283) – never took office
Jean I de Grailly (1283–1287) – third appointment
William Middleton (1287–1288)
John de Havering (1288–1294) – first appointment
John St John (1294–1297)
John de Hastings (1302–1305) – first appointment
John de Havering (1305–1308) – second appointment
Guy Ferre (1308–1309) – first appointment
Amanèu du Foussat (1309–1310) – acting during the seneschal's absence from September 1309 to February 1310
John de Hastings (1309–1312) – second appointment
Assiu de Galard – acting during the seneschal's absence from August 1311 to February 1312
John de Ferrers of Chartley (1312) – died in office
Jordan Morant – his lieutenant
Estèbe Ferréol (1312–1313)
Amaury III de Craon (1313–1316) – first appointment
Gaucelm de Campagne his lieutenant
Gilbert Peche (1316–1317)
Antonio di Pessagno (1317–1318)
Amanèu du Foussat (1317–1318) – acting during the seneschal's absence from November 1317.
William de Montague (1318–1319) – died in office
Amanèu du Foussat (1319–1320)
Maurice de Berkeley (1320–1320)
Amaury III de Craon (1320–1322) – second appointment
Fulk le Strange (1322)
Ralph Basset of Drayton (1323–1324) – first appointment
Robert de Shirland (1324)
Richard Grey (1324)
Ralph Basset of Drayton (1324) – second appointment
John de Wisham (1324–1325)
John de Segrave (1324–1325) – probably never took up office
Henri IV de Sully (1325–1326)
Oliver Ingham (1326–1327) – first appointment

John de Hausted (1327–1331)
Oliver Ingham (1331–1343) – second appointment
John de Norwich (1338) – lieutenant of above
Nicholas de la Beche (1343–1345)
Ralph Stafford (1345–1347)
Hugh Hastings (1347) – did not act
Thomas Coke (1347–1349)
Frank van Hallen (1349)
John de Cheverston (1350––?1351) – first appointment
Arnold Savage (1350) – lieutenant of above
John de Charneles (1351) – lieutenant of above
John de Cheverston (1354) – second appointment
Richard de Stafford of Clifton (1361)
John Chandos (1361–1362)
John de Cheverston (1362) – third appointment
Thomas Felton (1363–1377)
William le Scrope (1383–1384) – first appointment
John Harpeden (1385–1389)
John Trailly (1389–1390) – first appointment
William le Scrope (1390–1394) – second appointment
John Trailly (1397) – second appointment
Archambaud de Grailly (1397–1399)
Gaillard II de Durfort (1399–1415)
John Tiptoft (1415–1423)
John Radcliffe (1423–1436)
Thomas Rempston (1440–1441; 1442)
Robert Vere (1441) – first appointment
Robert Roos (1442–1443)
William Bonville (1442–1445) – first appointment
Robert Vere (1445) – second appointment
William Bonville (1450) – second appointment
Richard Woodville (1450–1453)
William Bonville (1453) – third appointment, did not act
Roger Camoys (1453)

Notes

References
Seneschals of Gascony
Warren, W.L.; Henry II (English Monarchs)
 
 

12th century in France
13th century in France
Historical legal occupations
Legal history of France